William Walderham Kettle (10 September 1898 – 12 October 1980) was an English professional footballer who played as an outside left in the Football League for Wigan Borough, Southend United, Southport and Grimsby Town. He was an English Schools' international.

Personal life 
Two days prior to his 18th birthday in September 1916, Kettle enlisted as a private in the Durham Light Infantry. He was wounded and lost a toe during the course of his service in the First World War. Kettle was discharged from the army in March 1919. He married in 1923 and had four children. As of 1939, Kettle was working as a drayman for Westoe Brewery.

Career statistics

References

1898 births
1980 deaths
English footballers
Leeds City F.C. players
South Shields F.C. (1889) players
Newcastle United F.C. players
Ebbw Vale F.C. players
Southend United F.C. players
Grimsby Town F.C. players
Southport F.C. players
Wigan Borough F.C. players
English Football League players
British Army personnel of World War I
Durham Light Infantry soldiers
Association football outside forwards
Association football inside forwards
Footballers from South Shields